Luis Bernardo Santana Vera (born July 9, 1991) is an Ecuadorian footballer who plays as a forward for C.D. El Nacional.

References

1991 births
Living people
Sportspeople from Guayaquil
Association football forwards
Ecuadorian footballers
Ecuadorian Serie A players
Guayaquil City F.C. footballers
C.D. Técnico Universitario footballers
L.D.U. Quito footballers
C.D. Cuenca footballers
Mushuc Runa S.C. footballers
L.D.U. Portoviejo footballers